Sentence(s) or The Sentence may refer to:

Common uses
 Sentence (law), a punishment imposed on a person who has been convicted in court of a criminal offence
 Sentence (linguistics), a grammatical unit of language
 Sentence (mathematical logic), a formula not containing free variables

Arts, entertainment, and media
 Sentence (music), a type of musical phrase
 Sentences, a 12th-century theological book by Peter Lombard
 Sentences (Muhly), a 2014 oratorio by Nico Muhly
 Sentences: The Life of MF Grimm, a 2007 autobiographical graphic novel by MF Grimm
 The Sentence, a 2018 American documentary film by Rudy Valdez
 "The Sentence" (The Outer Limits), an episode of the TV series The Outer Limits
 The Sentence, a 2016 novel and performance piece by Alistair Fruish
 The Sentence, a 2021 novel by Louise Erdrich